Omega Island is an island  long, which lies immediately south of Eta Island in the Melchior Islands, Palmer Archipelago. This island, the largest feature in the southeast part of the Melchior Islands, is part of what was called Île Melchior by the French Antarctic Expedition under Jean-Baptiste Charcot, 1903–05, but the name Melchior now applies for the whole island group. Omega Island was roughly surveyed by DI personnel in 1927. The name Omega, derived from the last letter of the Greek alphabet, appears to have been first used on a 1946 Argentine government chart following surveys of the Melchior Islands by Argentine expeditions in 1942 and 1943.

See also 
 Composite Antarctic Gazetteer
 List of Antarctic and sub-Antarctic islands
 List of Antarctic islands south of 60° S
 SCAR
 Territorial claims in Antarctica

References

External links 

Islands of the Palmer Archipelago